Alfred Hoyun Song (February 16, 1919 - October 11, 2004), birth name as Song Ho-yeon, is a Korean American politician served in the California State Assembly for the 45th district from 1963 to 1967. He served in the California State Senate for the 28th District from 1967 to 1974 and the 26th district from 1974 to 1978. During World War II he served in the United States Army.

References

American people of Korean descent
American politicians of Korean descent
United States Army personnel of World War II
Democratic Party members of the California State Assembly
Democratic Party California state senators
1919 births
2004 deaths